Information Technology Authority (ITA) was a governmental authority in Oman that was responsible for establishing and running the e-governance services in Oman.

The authority was replaced in October 2019 by the Ministry of Transport, Communications and Information Technology (Oman).

References

Government of Oman